The 2015 U.S. F2000 Cooper Tires Winterfest was the fifth year of the winter racing series promoted by the U.S. F2000 National Championship. It consisted of five races held during two race meets during February 2015 and served as preparation for the 2015 U.S. F2000 National Championship.

The championship was won by Cape Motorsports driver Nico Jamin, after his race victory in the final race at Barber Motorsports Park, which awarded double points after one of the track's scheduled three races was canceled due to bad weather. Jamin finished five points clear of Afterburner Autosport's Victor Franzoni, who won two races and lost a third due to a rules infraction. A further three points behind in third place was the only other race winner, Jake Eidson of Pabst Racing Services, who won two races at NOLA Motorsports Park.

Drivers and teams

Race calendar and results
The series schedule, along with the other Road to Indy series schedules, was announced on November 3, 2014.

Championship standings

Drivers' championship

Teams' championship

References

External links

U.S. F2000 National Championship seasons
U.S. F2000 Winterfest
U.S. F2000 Winterfest
U.S. F2000 Winterfest
2015 in formula racing